The flag and the coat of arms of Kelantan are state symbols of Kelantan, Malaysia. Like the flag of Kedah, the Kelantanese flag is red with a single charge from Kelantan's coat of arms, albeit partially.

Similar to other states of Malaysia with Malay royalties, both the flag and arms of Kelantan are influenced by Kelantanese royalties, Islam, and political and natural symbols of the state.

Flag 
Adopted in 1924, the Kelantanese flag consists of only a red field with a white charge in the centre derived from its state coat of arms, consisting of the arm's crescent, five pointed star, dual spears and unsheathed krises. The red represents the honesty of Kelantan's settlers, citizens and king (the Sultan of Kelantan), while the charge signifies the sanctity of the Sultan of Kelantan.

History 

Between 1912 and 1923, Kelantan adopted a significantly different flag design, which encompasses a white flag with a blue border enveloping the top, fly, and hoist of the flag, and Jawi scriptures stylised as a canine or a feline. The tip of the tail is interpreted as "Kerajaan Kelantan" (denoting the Kelantanese government), while the main body of the animal-based scripture contains two passages from the Qur'an, an excerpt of the 13th ayat of the 61st surah, the Al-Saf:

Following the abolishment of the 1912-1923 flag and the adoption of the new red-and-white flag in 1924, the charge of the new flag was given minor refinements over time. Between 1928 and 1932, accounts of the flag were made indicating the charge's heraldic elements was more closely similar to that of the arms. While white, the charge sported more intricate details in the interior, and the points of the star are connected to their opposite corners by red lines. These details are since removed, contributing to a more silhouetted appearance of the charge.

Variants

Royal Standards 
The royal family of Kelantan flies a series of flags for its respectable members. High-ranking members are designated their own flags, while others are grouped to fly any one of three flags. The flags vary by design, but are typically designed as either a plain flag or a flag with a quarter-length hoist.

 the Standard of the Sultan (Al Sultan): A white flag with the royal arms in blue (a blue star and upward pointing crescent surmounted by a coronet similar to that from the arms, surrounded by a blue wreath) charged on the centre; an older, more intricate variant of the flag features a yellow star and crescent, a yellow crown, and a blue wreath;
 the Standard of the Sultanah (Raja Perempuan): A yellow flag with the royal arms in black charged on the centre;
 the Standard of the Crown Prince (Bakal Sultan): A white flag with a yellow hoist measuring an estimated one quarter of the flag's length, with a black star and crescent (a simplified variant of the royal arms) charged on the fly;
 the Standard of the Regent (Pemangku Sultan): A horizontally divided white-over-red flag with the royal arms charged on the centre;

Governmental flags

District flags 
As with neighbouring Terengganu as well as Johor, each administrative district (jajahan) in Kelantan was assigned its own flag. The flags follow a standard pattern - the flag is divided into four quarters with the Kelantan flag occupying the canton, the bottom right quarter coloured red (as per the Kelantan flag) and the remaining quarters assigned the district's respective colour. The design somehow bears a semblance to the flag of Selangor.

Coat of arms

Design 

The Kelantanese coat of arms, bearing elements of Western heraldry, consists of a crescent and a five-pointed star backed by three sets of weapons (compared to only two on the state's flag). The arms is further supported by a pair of salient muntjacs (kijangs), topped by a coronet, and includes a motto as a scroll below. Also present are decorative flora. The arms may be depicted entirely in yellow-to-orange, but variants with more vibrant inclusions of red and blue are also in use.

The Kelantese arms was introduced in 1916 under the order of Sultan Muhammad IV. Originally consisting of only the crescent and star, the three pair of weapons and the motto, the kijangs and coronet were only added several years later by Sultan Ismail.(1880 - 1944), resulting in its present form. Until 1916, Kelantan had no coat of arms.

Details of the arms' elements are as follows:

Helm
The helm is depicted as a coronet adorned with crescents and five-pointed stars, representing the sovereignty of the Kelantanese Sultan.

Crescent and five-pointed star
Together with the weapons, the crescent and five-pointed star form the principal element of the arms, with the crescent pointed upwards and its tips at the same height as the star. They symbolise the Islamic faith.

Dual spears and krises
The dual spears and unsheathed krises, traditional weapons of Kelantanese Malay culture, back the crescent, with the spears pointing upwards and the kris pointing at diagonal directions downwards and inwards. Both weapons signify the strength of Kelantanese Malays.

Dual cannons
Like the spears and krises, the dual cannons back the crescent, but point outwards and downwards diagonally. The cannons represent the Kelantan's constant readiness to defend itself.

Supporters
The supporters of the arms are two salient muntjacs (kijangs), which serves as a reminder of Kelantan's long history. The kijang'''s prominence may trace back to the rule of the legendary Queen of Kelantan, Che' Siti Wan Kembang who adored her beloved kijang'' to the point of adopting coin with their depictions.

Motto
The motto consists of a scroll with written Jawi that reads  (Surrender to God Kingdom of Kelantan).

References 

Kelantan
Kelantan
Kelantan
Kelantan
Kelantan
Kelantan
Kelantan
Kelantan
Kelantan
Kelantan
Kelantan
Kelantan
1924 establishments in British Malaya